Mary Eileen Chesterton (December 20, 1949 – October 3, 1979), known professionally as Claudia Jennings, was an American actress and model. Jennings was Playboy magazine's Playmate of the Month for November 1969 and also Playmate of the Year for 1970. She subsequently pursued a career in acting, and was known as the "Queen of B movies". She died in an automobile accident in 1979.

Career
Mary Eileen Chesterton (known as "Mimi" to friends and family) was born in Saint Paul, Minnesota in 1949, later moving to Milwaukee, Wisconsin. When her family moved from Richmond, Indiana to Evanston, Illinois as a result of her father becoming the advertising director with Skilsaw, she transferred at the start of her sophomore year to Evanston Township High School (ETHS) where she graduated in 1968. She was featured in a silent, plotless movie titled after her nickname which was shot on Super 8 film by fellow ETHS classmate Todd McCarthy. She worked as a receptionist at Playboy and then posed for the magazine in 1969. She adopted the name Claudia Jennings because she didn't want to embarrass her family and that she thought "Mimi" sounded too girlish. Her original pictorial was photographed by Pompeo Posar. She was Playmate of the Year in 1970, and was awarded a pink Mercury Capri.

After her appearances in Playboy, Jennings became an actress in exploitation movies and in television. In 1973, she had a guest appearance on The Brady Bunch episode titled "Adios, Johnny Bravo". Jennings auditioned for the role as Kate Jackson's replacement on the hit television show Charlie's Angels, but the role was awarded to Shelley Hack.

Death
On October 3, 1979, Jennings died in an automobile collision on the Pacific Coast Highway near Malibu, California. She was 29.

Jennings was featured in a 2000 episode of E! True Hollywood Story in which several of her friends and acquaintances were interviewed. The episode was made without the cooperation of her family, who considered the show too "tabloid" in style.

Filmography

Film

Television

See also

 List of people in Playboy 1960–1969
 List of people in Playboy 1970–1979

Further reading
 Claudia Jennings –The Authorized Biography. Midnight Marquee Publishing, 2018, by Eric Jonathan Karell

References

External links

 

1949 births
1979 deaths
American film actresses
Road incident deaths in California
American television actresses
Actresses from Evanston, Illinois
Actresses from Milwaukee
Evanston Township High School alumni
1960s Playboy Playmates
Playboy Playmates of the Year
Actresses from Saint Paul, Minnesota
20th-century American actresses